L'Argentine is a mountain of the Vaud Alps, overlooking Solalex above Gryon in the canton of Vaud. The mountain is known by climbers for its Northwest face, the Miroir d'Argentine, which is smooth like a "mirror". The summit is distinguished by the name Haute Pointe and culminates at 2,421 metres above sea level.

References

External links
Miroir d'Argentine on Summitpost

Mountains of the Alps
Mountains of Switzerland
Mountains of the canton of Vaud